Basevi is a surname that comes from Bathsheba. Notable people with the surname include:

 Abramo Basevi (1818–1885), Italian musicologist, associated with the music journal L'Armonia
 George Basevi (1794–1845), English architect
 James Basevi (1890–1962), British born art director and special effects expert
 James Palladio Basevi (1832– 1871), British surveyor and army officer

Kogi State